Khibiny, also known as Khibino, is the rural locality (a Station) in Apatity municipality of Murmansk Oblast, Russia. The village is located beyond the Arctic circle, on the Kola Peninsula. It is 142 m above sea level.

Khibino served as the administrative center of Yekostrovsky Selsoviet of Kolsko-Loparskaya Volost of Alexandrovsky Uyezd of Arkhangelsk Governorate in the Russian SFSR, when the selsoviet's administrative center was moved here from Polovinka by the Resolution of Kolsko-Loparskaya Volost Executive Committee of December 9, 1924.

As of the 2010 census, Khibino is uninhabited.

References

Notes

Sources

Rural localities in Murmansk Oblast